Victoria is a feminine first name. It is also used as a family name.

Origin and meaning forms

Victoria is the Latin word for 'victory' and is used as the feminine form corresponding to the name Victor.

In Roman mythology, Victoria was the name of the goddess of victory, corresponding to the Greek goddess Nike.

People

Given name, usually without mention of surname 
 Princess Victoria (disambiguation), several people
Victoria, Crown Princess of Sweden (born 1977), Crown Princess of Sweden, Duchess of Västergötland
 Princess Victoria of the United Kingdom (1868-1935), daughter of King Edward VII and Queen Alexandra
 Princess Victoria Melita of Saxe-Coburg and Gotha (1876-1936), daughter of Alfred, Duke of Saxe-Coburg and Gotha
 Victoria, Princess Royal (1840–1901), daughter of Queen Victoria and later Empress of Germany
 Princess Viktoria of Prussia (1866-1929), Prince Adolf of Schaumburg-Lippe 
 Princess Victoria of Hesse and by Rhine (1863-1950), daughter of Louis IV, Grand Duke of Hesse
 Princess Patricia of Connaught (1886-1974), later Lady Patricia Ramsay. Her first given name was Victoria
 Victoria Louise of Prussia (1892-1980), Duchess of Brunswick. The only daughter of Kaiser Wilhlem II
 Princess Viktória de Bourbon de Parme (born 1982), wife of Prince Jaime de Bourbon de Parme
 Princess Victoria Romanovna (born 1982), wife of Grand Duke George Mikhailovich of Russia
 Victoria (Gallic Empire) (died 271), mother of Gallic Emperor Victorinus
 Queen Victoria (1819–1901), Queen of the United Kingdom (1837–1901) and Empress of India (1876–1901)
 Victoria of Baden (1862–1930), Queen of Sweden
 Victoria Eugenie of Battenberg (1887-1969), granddaughter of Queen Victoria and later Queen consort of Spain
 Victoria of Saxe-Coburg-Saalfeld (1786-1861), Duchess of Kent, mother of Queen Victoria 
 Viktorija (born 1958), Serbian singer
 Viktoria (born 1970), Filipina singer
 Victoria, stage name of Lisa Marie Varon (born 1971), professional wrestler

Given name with surname 
 Victoria Aleksanyan (born 1987), Armenian film director
 Victoria Ann Lewis, American actress and theatre artist
 Victoria Azarenka (born 1989), Belarusian tennis player
 Victoria Barbă (1926–2020), Moldovan animated film director
 Viktoria Baškite (born 1985), Estonian chess player
 Victoria Beckham (born 1974), English singer, songwriter, fashion designer and television personality
 Victoria Brittain (born 1942), British journalist and author
 Victoria Carbó (born 1963), Argentine field hockey player
 Victoria Climbié (1991–2000), notable child murder case in the U.K.
 Victoria Coren Mitchell (born 1972), English writer, presenter and professional poker player
 Victoria Crawford (born 1986), WWE professional wrestler and model
 Victoria Cuenca (fl. 1928–1946), Argentine actress, vedette
 Victoria de Angelis (born 2000), Italian-Danish bassist and songwriter
 Victoria de Stefano (1940-2023), Italian-Venezuelan novelist, essayist, philosopher and educator
 Victoria Dunlap (born 1989), American basketball player
 Victoria Edwards (born 1948), New Zealand artist, printmaker and art educator
 Victoria Ekanoye (born 1981), English actress
 Victoria Fuller (born 1970), American model and actress
 Victoria Georgieva (born 1997), Bulgarian singer and songwriter known professionally by the mononym Victoria (stylised in all caps)
 Victoria Haralabidou (born 1971) Greek actress
Victoria Hayward (born 1992), Canadian softball player
Victoria Hayward (1876-1956), Bermudan-born travel writer and journalist
 Victoria Hislop (born 1959), English writer
 Victoria Jackson (born 1959), American comedian and actress
 Victoria Justice (born 1993), American actress, singer, model and spokesmodel
 Victoria Kakuktinniq (born 1989), Canadian Inuk fashion designer
 Victoria (Tori) Kelly (born 1992), American singer-songwriter
 Victoria de Lesseps (born 1994), French-American artist
 Victoria Loke, Singaporean actress
 Victoria B. Mars, Chairman of Mars, Incorporated
 Victoria Marshman, candidate on America's Next Top Model, Cycle 9 
 Victoria Mavridou (born 1991), Greek weightlifter
 Victoria Monét, American singer
 Victoria Nyame (died 1980), Ghanaian politician
 Victoria Palacios (born 1977), Mexican race walker
 Victoria Pendleton (born 1980), British jockey and former Olympic cyclist
 Victoria Powers, American mathematician
 Victoria Principal (born 1950), American actress
 Victoria Rowell  (born 1959),  American actress and dancer
 Victoria Ruffo  (born 1962),  Mexican actress
Victoria Schwab (born 1987), American author, also published under the name V.E. Schwab
 Victoria Silvstedt (born 1974), Swedish model and actress
 Victoria Song (born 1987), Chinese idol based in South Korea and part of the K-Pop girl group f(x)
 Victoria Soto (1985–2012), first grade teacher at Sandy Hook Elementary
 Victoria (Tori) Spelling (born 1973), American actress
 Victoria Stafford (2000-2009), Canadian murder victim
 Victoria Toensing (born c. 1940), American jurist and terrorism official
 Victoria Tolbert (1916–1997), First Lady of Liberia
Victoria Velasquez (born 1991), Danish politician
 Victoria Wood (1953–2016), English singer, writer and comedian
 Victoria Yeates (born 1983), English actress 
Viktoria Komova (born 1995), Russian artistic gymnast and two-time Olympic silver medalist
Viktoria Listunova (born 2005), Russian artistic gymnast
Viktoria Rebensburg (born 1989), German alpine skier 
Victoria Swarovski (born 1993), Austrian Singer, Presenter, Heiress of Multi-Billion Swarovski Fortune
Viktoria Schmidt-Linsenhoff (1944–2013), German art historian and professor
Viktoria Vasilieva (born 2003), Russian figure skater
Viktoria Wedin, Swedish Paralympic sport shooter
 Little Boots (born 1984), British musician and singer, given name Victoria Hesketh
 Pixie Lott (born 1991), British singer, given name Victoria Louise Lott

Surname 
 Adia Victoria (born 1986), American singer and songwriter
 Ana Victoria (born 1983), American-born Mexican singer-songwriter, dancer and record producer
 Brian Victoria (born 1939), educator and author on Buddhism
 Eduardo Victoria (born 1970), Mexican actor
 Eladio Victoria (1864–1939), Dominican politician
 Francisco Victoria (1796–1830), Mexican independence fighter
 Guadalupe Victoria (1786–1843), first president of Mexico
 Gustavo Victoria (born 1980), Colombian football player
 Heidi Victoria (born 1967), Australian politician
 Manuel Victoria (died 1833), Mexican governor of Alta California in 1831
 Tomás Luis de Victoria (1548–1611), Spanish composer

Fictional characters
 Victoria Newman Abbott, a character on the America soap opera The Young and the Restless
 Victoria Lord Banks, a character on the American soap opera One Life to Live
 Victoria, a character in Hitman: Absolution
 Victoria, the malicious vampire in the Twilight series, the antagonist of New Moon and Eclipse
 Victoria Anne Sugden, a character on the British soap opera Emmerdale
 Victoria Argent, a werewolf hunter and mother of the main female character Allison Argent in MTV's television show Teen Wolf.
 Victoria "Vicki" Donovan, a human high school girl who was turned into a vampire by Damon Salvatore in the first season of The CW network's hit television series The Vampire Diaries
 Victoria Everglot, a character in the Tim Burton film Corpse Bride
 Victoria "Vicky" McGee, a character played by Heather Locklear in the 1984 American science fiction horror movie Firestarter
 Victoria Page, in the Dream Theater concept album Metropolis Pt. 2: Scenes from a Memory
 Victoria "Tori" Vega, in (TV Series) Victorious played by Victoria Justice
 Victoria Waterfield, in the British TV series Doctor Who played by Deborah Watling

See also
 Saint Victoria (disambiguation), several Christian saints with this name
 Victoria (disambiguation)
 Victoire (disambiguation), French equivalent
 Viktoria (disambiguation)
 Viktoriya
 Viktorija (disambiguation)

English feminine given names
Latin feminine given names
Given names
Feminine given names